The 21st Hollywood Film Awards were held on November 6, 2017. The ceremony took place at The Beverly Hilton Hotel in Santa Monica, California.

Winners
Hollywood Career Achievement Award Gary Oldman
Hollywood Actor Award Jake Gyllenhaal – Stronger
Hollywood Supporting Actor Award Sam Rockwell – Three Billboards Outside Ebbing, Missouri
Hollywood Actress Award Kate Winslet – Wonder Wheel
Hollywood Supporting Actress Award Allison Janney – I, Tonya
Hollywood Comedy Award Adam Sandler – The Meyerowitz Stories
Hollywood Breakout Actor Award Timothée Chalamet – Call Me by Your Name
Hollywood Breakout Actress Award Mary J. Blige – Mudbound
New Hollywood Award Jamie Bell – Film Stars Don't Die in Liverpool
Hollywood Ensemble Award Caitlin Carver, Paul Walter Hauser, Allison Janney, Julianne Nicholson, Margot Robbie, and Sebastian Stan – I, Tonya
Hollywood Breakout Ensemble Award Jonathan Banks, Mary J. Blige, Jason Clarke, Garrett Hedlund, Jason Mitchell, Rob Morgan, and Carey Mulligan – Mudbound
Hollywood Comedy Ensemble Award Holly Hunter, Zoe Kazan, Kumail Nanjiani, and Ray Romano – The Big Sick
Hollywood Animation Award Coco
Hollywood Documentary Award Sean Combs – Can't Stop, Won't Stop: A Bad Boy Story
Hollywood Foreign Language Film Award Angelina Jolie and Loung Ung – First They Killed My Father
Hollywood Director Award Joe Wright – Darkest Hour
Hollywood Producer Award Broderick Johnson, Andrew A. Kosove, and Cynthia Sikes Yorkin – Blade Runner 2049
Hollywood Screenwriter Award Scott Neustadter and Michael H. Weber – The Disaster Artist
Hollywood Song Award Common, Andra Day, and Diane Warren – "Stand Up For Something" from Marshall
Hollywood Cinematography Award Roger Deakins – Blade Runner 2049
Hollywood Film Composer Award Thomas Newman – Victoria & Abdul
Hollywood Editor Award Sidney Wolinsky – The Shape of Water
Hollywood Visual Effects Award Dan Barrett, Dan Lemmon, Joe Letteri, and Erik Winquist – War for the Planet of the Apes
Hollywood Costume Design Award Jacqueline Durran – Beauty and the Beast, Darkest Hour
Hollywood Make-Up & Hair Styling Award Jenny Shircore – Beauty and the Beast
Hollywood Production Design Award Dennis Gassner – Blade Runner 2049
Hollywood Sound Award Dave Acord and Addison Teague – Guardians of the Galaxy Vol. 2

References

External links
 

Hollywood
2017 in California
Hollywood Film Awards
2017 in American cinema